This is a list of highest points in California, in alphabetical order by county.

All elevations use the North American Vertical Datum of 1988 (NAVD88), the currently accepted vertical control datum for United States, Canada and Mexico. Elevations are from the National Geodetic Survey (NGS) when available. Others are from the United States Geological Survey topographic maps when available. These can be found on the Peakbagger.com web pages. Elevations followed by a plus sign (+) were interpolated by the compiler using topographic map contour lines. The true elevation is between that shown and the elevation plus the contour line interval which is forty feet in most instances. Elevations from the NGS are rounded to the nearest whole number.

References
Suttle, Gary. California County Summits. Berkeley, Ca.: Wilderness Press, 1994.

Highest by county
Highest
California
California